Minneapolis Star Tribune Company v. Commissioner, 460 U.S. 575 (1983), was an opinion of the Supreme Court of the United States overturning a use tax on paper and ink in excess of $100,000 consumed in any calendar year.  The Minneapolis Star Tribune initially paid the tax and sued for a refund.

Opinion of the Court
On its face, this ruling finds that state tax systems cannot treat the press differently from any other business without significant and substantial justification.  The state of Minnesota demonstrated no such justification to impose a special tax on a select few newspaper publishers.  Therefore, this tax was in violation of the First Amendment's guarantee of freedom of the press.

See also
 Grosjean v. American Press Co. (1936)
 List of United States Supreme Court cases, volume 460

Further reading

External links

1983 in United States case law
United States Supreme Court cases
United States Supreme Court cases of the Burger Court
United States Free Speech Clause case law
United States taxation and revenue case law
Mass media in Minneapolis–Saint Paul